Viljanen is a Finnish surname. Notable people with the surname include:

Eerikki Viljanen (born 1975), Finnish politician
Elias Viljanen (born 1975), Finnish musician
Emil Viljanen (1874–1954), Finnish civil servant and politician
Heidi Viljanen, Finnish politician
Ilkka Viljanen (born 1960), Finnish politician
Jalmari Viljanen (1872–1928), Finnish farmer and politician
Kim Viljanen (born 1981), Finnish darts player
Lauri Viljanen (1900–1994), Finnish literary critic and writer
Matti Viljanen (1937–2015), Finnish engineer and politician
Pekka Viljanen (athlete) (1921–1995), Finnish racewalker
Pekka Viljanen (politician) (born 1945), Finnish farmer and politician
Petri Viljanen (born 1987), Finnish footballer
Valtteri Viljanen (born 1994), Finnish ice hockey player
Ville Viljanen (born 1971), Finnish footballer
V.M.J. Viljanen (1874–1946), Finnish engineer, business executive and politician

Finnish-language surnames